Cedar was a gold, silver and copper mining town in Mohave County, Arizona, United States. It was founded circa 1875 on the eastern slope of the Hualapai Mountains, sixty miles southeast of Kingman. A post office was established on September 24, 1895, and closed on July 31, 1911. In addition to the post office there were two saloons, and a general store with several homes. In 1907 the Cedar Valley Gold & Silver Company along with the Yucca Cyanide Mining & Milling Company reported that approximately 200 people lived in the town, within a decade later the site was abandoned. A half mile area inside Cedar Valley is littered with stone ruins and foundations of the mining buildings.

References

External links
 Cedar on The Ghost Town of the Month
 Cedar – ghosttowns.com

Ghost towns in Arizona
Former populated places in Mohave County, Arizona
Mining communities in Arizona